The Islands is the collective name for the set of large islands south of Cape Cod in the southeast corner of the U.S. state of Massachusetts: Nantucket, Martha's Vineyard, the Elizabeth Islands, and a small number of minor islands. The Islands are the location of numerous beach resorts, celebrity second homes, and preserved buildings dating back to the whaling era.

Geography

Nantucket Island (together with the two smaller islands of Tuckernuck and Muskeget) constitutes the town of Nantucket; the Elizabeth Islands constitute the town of Gosnold; and Martha's Vineyard contains the towns of Edgartown, Oak Bluffs, Tisbury (including Vineyard Haven), West Tisbury, Chilmark, and Aquinnah. They are separated from Cape Cod by Nantucket Sound and Vineyard Sound, and from the South Coast by Buzzards Bay.

History

The disputed territory of the Islands came under absolute British control following the English acquisition of the former Dutch colony of New Amsterdam. The Islands were established as Dukes County, New York in 1683, and then in 1691 they were transferred from New York to Massachusetts and then separated into two counties: Nantucket County (consisting of Nantucket alone) and Dukes County, containing all the other islands.

Originally the home of indigenous Wampanoag, the area was otherwise inhabited by only a few landlords and seafaring families until a brief golden era when local population and wealth grew immensely as a result of the Islands being the home of many commercial whalers and their crews, due to demand for blubber for use in oil lamps. The whale oil market became obsolete following the development of modern petroleum extraction, with dire consequences for local sailors and merchants, until the area was discovered as a summer colony, first by wealthy visitors from mainland New England and later from around the country and beyond. Much of the isolated rural culture of the Islands has been preserved from new construction, partly because they can be easily accessed only by ferry or aircraft due to their separation from the rest of the state by Vineyard Sound and Nantucket Sound.

Although the arrival of large numbers of people as well as new homes, retailers, and restaurants has led to rising costs for many long-time residents, the unique local lifestyle is still visible in part by an occasionally emerging secession movement of variable strength.

Attractions

Attractions on the Islands include Flying Horses Carousel, Cape Poge Wildlife Refuge, Polly Hill Arboretum, and Troubled Shores supplemented by ample opportunities for cycling, equestrianism, fishing, sailing, and some of the finest whale watching in the world.

People associated with the Islands

The Islands have been a part of the lives of many noted personalities, including Mary Morrill, Mayhew Folger, Lucretia Mott, Rowland Hussey Macy, Walter Cronkite, William Styron, William Labov, Ted Kennedy, David McCullough, and  Carly Simon.

Regions of Massachusetts
Cape Cod and the Islands